The New Jersey Register is the official journal of the Government of New Jersey that contains information on proposed regulations and rulemaking activities.  It is published semimonthly by the state's Office of the Administrative Law.  The first issue was printed and published by the New Jersey Law Journal on September 25, 1969.

See also 
Federal Register
Law of New Jersey

References

External links 
 Online Access to New Jersey Register
 Digitized collection

New Jersey law
United States state official journals